Digital Molecular Matter (DMM) is a proprietary middleware physics engine developed by Pixelux for generating realistic destruction and deformation effects. The offline version can support high-resolution simulations for use in film special effects.
The real-time version is designed for video games, and other simulation needs by attempting to simulate physical real-world systems. Unlike traditional real-time simulation engines, which tend to be based on rigid body kinematics, the use of finite element analysis (FEA) allows DMM to simulate a large set of physical properties. Developers can assign physical properties to a given object or portion of an object, which allow the object to behave as it would in the real world (ice, gummy bear, etc.). In addition, the properties of objects or parts of objects can be changed at runtime, allowing for additional interesting effects.

DMM can be authored or used in Maya or 3ds Max to create simulation-based visual effects.

Academy Award

In 2015 three of the key architects behind DMM, James F. O'Brien, Eric Parker, and Ben Cole, were recognized for their work on DMM with an Academy Award.  The citation for the award reads:

To Ben Cole for the design of the Kali Destruction System, to Eric Parker for the development of the Digital Molecular Matter toolkit, and to James O’Brien for his influential research on the finite element methods that served as a foundation for these tools.

The combined innovations in Kali and DMM provide artists with an intuitive, art-directable system for the creation of scalable and realistic fracture and deformation simulations. These tools established finite element methods as a new reference point for believable on-screen destruction.

Platform availability
DMM is available and optimized for Microsoft's Windows, Xbox 360, Sony's PlayStation 3, Apple's Mac OS X, and Linux.

Function
DMM is a physical simulation system which models the material properties of objects allowing them to break and bend in accordance to the stress placed on them. Structures modeled with DMM can break and bend if they are not physically viable. Objects made of glass, steel, stone and jelly are all possible to create and simulate in real-time with DMM.  The system accomplishes this by running a finite element simulation that computes how the materials would actually behave.

Use
DMM has been used in LucasArts's Star Wars: The Force Unleashed, and was used again for Star Wars: The Force Unleashed II.

Plugins for Autodesk Media & Entertainment's 3ds Max and Maya animation software are also available.  The plugin is built into Maya 2012.

DMM has been integrated with Gamebryo, Trinigy Vision Engine, Irrlicht, OGRE and other game engines.

MPC Moving Picture Company has integrated DMM into their internal software pipeline known as Kali.

Movies Using DMM

Several movies have made use of DMM for generating offline special effects.  These include:

 Avatar  (2009) – Trees breaking, helicopters smashing into each other – Weta Digital
 Sucker Punch (2011) – Stone floor and statues, wooden pillars, building exterior, and other elements in the Temple Scene – MPC
 Source Code (2011) – Train hitting brick wall – MPC
 X-Men: First Class (2011) – Destruction of ship – MPC
 Sherlock Holmes: A Game of Shadows  (2011) – Tower collapsing, shell through tree, wall getting smashed by shell – MPC
 Harry Potter and the Deathly Hallows – Part 2  (2011) – Stone Knights – MPC
 Mission: Impossible – Ghost Protocol (2010) – Shattering glass in server room – Fuel VFX
 Wrath of the Titans (2012) – MPC
 Mirror Mirror (2012) – Prime Focus  – The Queen's Cottage destruction segment 
 Prometheus (2012) – MPC
 Abraham Lincoln, Vampire Hunter (2012) – Method Studios – Bridge destruction sequence
 Astérix & Obélix: Au service de Sa Majesté (2012) – Wooden Ship Destruction
 Skyfall (2012)  – Helicopter crash – MPC
 The Campaign (2012) – Baby punching scene
 Man of Steel (2013) –  MPC – Smallville battle destruction
 Jack the Giant Slayer (2013) – Castle destruction – MPC
 After Earth (2013)
 Olympus has Fallen (2013)
 A Good Day to Die Hard (2013) – The Helicopter Strafing/Tube Destruction – Method
 Warm Bodies (2013)  – Wall Destruction – Look Effects
 The Secret Life of Walter Mitty (2013) – MPC – multiple scenes including Street Fight Scene
 300: Rise of an Empire (2013)  – MPC  – Various Destruction sequences including the arrow shot
 The Lone Ranger – MPC – Tree destruction in the Comanche attack sequence
 Thousandth Street
 Godzilla – MPC – Citywide destruction in the epic third act
 Seventh Son – MPC
 X-Men: Days of Future Past – MPC
 47 Ronin – MPC
 Pompeii
 Maleficent – MPC
 The Amazing Spider-Man 2 – Times Square Billboards – Sony Pictures Imageworks.
 Guardians of the Galaxy – MPC
 Edge of Tomorrow – terrain, vehicles, alien "mimic" creature – Sony Imageworks, MPC
 Dark Shadows – MPC – Cracking heart and skin, wooden statue destruction
 Life of Pi – MPC
 Into the Storm – MPC
 Fast & Furious 6 – MPC
 World War Z – MPC

Television Shows, Shorts, and Commercials using DMM

 "Pillars of the Earth" - First church crumbling in a fire - UPP
 Trauma (episode 1) - Metal railing bending when helicopter crashes into building - Stargate Digital
 Falling Skies
 Terminex commercials by Vando Studio:
 "Beam"
 "Houses Destruction"
 "Slimy Octopus"
 "Hanging Bug"
 "Egg" (Vimeo)
 "Hallway"  (Vimeo)
 Henessy XO commercial
 Enel Power Company commercials: "Stone Smash on Lightbulb",  "Hammer Smash on Lightbulb"- Trizz Studio
 Holden Colorado launch commercial (Shot detail, Full commercial)
 "Oro Burus" (2013) (Vimeo: The Making of Oro Burus)

Development

The DMM tools and middleware were developed for film and game effects by Pixelux Entertainment over a 6.5 year period starting in 2004.  From 2005 through 2008, Pixelux's real-time version of DMM technology was exclusive to LucasArts Entertainment as a part of the Star Wars: The Force Unleashed (TFU) project.  The FEM system in DMM utilized an algorithm for fracture and deformation developed by University of California, Berkeley professor, James F. O'Brien, as part of his Ph.D. thesis. O'Brien then worked with a development team led by Pixelux CTO, Eric Parker, to develop code suitable for visual effects work and real-time applications. The DMM tools pipeline was designed and implemented by a team led by Mitchell Bunnell, the CEO of Pixelux.

An ARM version of DMM was incorporated by Pixelux into their DMM Touch iPhone/iPad product.

A version of the DMM Plug-In is included by Autodesk in their release of Maya 2012. The DMM Plug-In runs on all versions of Maya on all platforms in both 32 and 64-bit mode.

Technical Citations 

The following technical papers describe the algorithms that DMM is based on and some of the technical details of its implementation:

 Eric G. Parker and James F. O'Brien. "Real-Time Deformation and Fracture in a Game Environment". In Proceedings of the ACM SIGGRAPH/Eurographics Symposium on Computer Animation, pages 156–166, August 2009. Author hosted copy of paper  Paper in ACM Digital Library
 James F. O'Brien, Adam W. Bargteil, and Jessica K. Hodgins. "Graphical Modeling and Animation of Ductile Fracture". In Proceedings of ACM SIGGRAPH 2002, pages 291–294. ACM Press, August 2002. Author hosted copy of paper  Paper in ACM Digital Library
 James F. O'Brien and Jessica K. Hodgins. 2000. Animating fracture. Commun. ACM 43, 7 (July 2000), 68-75. Author hosted copy of paper  Paper in ACM Digital Library
 James F. O'Brien and Jessica K. Hodgins. "Graphical Modeling and Animation of Brittle Fracture". In Proceedings of ACM SIGGRAPH 1999, pages 137–146. ACM Press/Addison-Wesley Publishing Co., August 1999. Author hosted copy of paper  Paper in ACM Digital Library

Technology partners and usage by companies

Notable companies using the technology include:
 Autodesk (software)
 AMD (chip maker)
 NVIDIA (video cards etc.)
 LucasArts (digital art)
 Moving Picture Company (VFX House)
 VandoStudio - Terminix Flying Monster and Terminix Beams commercials - Destruction Shots with DMM

References

2009 software
Computer physics engines
Video game engines
Virtual reality